Jalan Terminal Feri (Johor state route J225) is a major road in Johor, Malaysia.

List of junctions

References

Roads in Johor